Brigitte Cuypers (born 3 December 1955) is a retired tennis player from South Africa.

Cuypers reached the final of the South African Championships singles event on five consecutive occasions from 1975 to 1979 and won the title in 1976, 1978 and 1979. In 1977, she won the doubles title at the Italian Open with compatriot Marise Kruger. In August 1979, she was runner–up at the Canadian Open, losing the final in three sets to Laura duPont.

Cuypers won the singles title at the Rhodesian Open in 1974 and 1975. She won the Akron Virginia Slims doubles title in 1976 with Mona Anne Guerrant.

Career finals

Singles: 8 (3 titles, 5 runner-ups)

Doubles: 3 (3 titles)

References

External links
 
 
 

South African female tennis players
1955 births
Living people
Sportspeople from Cape Town
White South African people